Lidya Tchakerian (born 1959) is a Lebanese artist. Since 2002, she has been living in the US.

Life
Tchakerian was born in Beirut in 1959 and she has an Armenian Lebanese background. She obtained her master's degree in her home town at the Lebanese Academy of Fine Arts and then lectured at the same university starting in 1989.

From 1996 to 1997, she received a French cultural scholarship.

She emigrated to the US in 2002.

Her large expressionist oil paintings explore the "conflicts of existence, history of war and culture, conscious and subconscious feelings of humanity"

Her studio is in Santa Clarita in Los Angeles County, California.

Exhibitions
Exhibitions include:
1992, Salon D'automne International Exhibition, Paris
2003, California
2004, Florida, Texas, California
2005, China, New York
2006, France, Germany
2009, France
2010, Rhode Island

Tchakerian has exhibited in China, America, Europe and Lebanon. She also exhibited work to commemorate the 100th anniversary of the Armenian genocide.

References

1959 births
Living people
Lebanese people of Armenian descent
Artists from Beirut
Lebanese painters
University of Balamand alumni
Lebanese women painters